St. Croix Falls High School is a public school serving grades 9 through 12 in St. Croix Falls, Polk County, Wisconsin, United States.

District Administrator: Mark Burandt
Athletic director: Paul Randolph

In 2012, U.S. News ranked St. Croix Falls High School as the ninth best high school in Wisconsin.

Notable alumni 

 Megan Kalmoe, U.S. Olympian Rower 
 Isla Hinck, co-founder of Easy Allies

References

External links
St. Croix Falls School District

Public high schools in Wisconsin
Schools in Polk County, Wisconsin